The Minnesota Commercial Railway  is a short line railroad in the United States.

This railroad operates out of the St. Paul area with service to Minneapolis, Bayport, Hugo, Fridley and New Brighton.  It is considered a switching and terminal railroad. It is based out of a roundhouse on Cleveland Ave. in St. Paul just blocks south of the former Amtrak station and its main yard is just to the north of the station.

Its lines consist of one to Fridley, with an interchange with Canadian National Railway and a small yard in New Brighton. The railroad also runs to Hugo and Bayport on trackage rights.  It interchanges with BNSF Railway at Northtown yard.  It also serves east Minneapolis' grain elevators by the University of Minnesota as well as the grain elevators on Minnesota State Highway 55 adjacent to the METRO Blue Line.

The Minnesota Commercial connects with all major railroads in the Twin Cities including: Canadian National Railway, BNSF Railway, Canadian Pacific Railway, Union Pacific Railway, and Twin Cities and Western Railroad.

The MNNR's roster consists of mainly Alco and GE locomotives.  With over two dozen locomotives, including one from Hamersley Iron in Australia, the roster is diverse and meets the switching and road freight needs.  Most units wear a red paint scheme much like that of the Green Bay and Western Railroad.

The line was formerly known as the Minnesota Transfer Railroad.  It was privately owned by the major railroads serving the Twin Cities area.
The Minnesota Transfer was leased by the Minnesota Commercial on February 1, 1987. At the time Minnesota Commercial leased Minnesota Transfer, the railroad was down to 6,000 revenue units a year.  By 2008, the Minnesota Commercial was handling over 46,000 revenue units.

References

External links 

 Official website
 Company Store
 Archive copy of a fan website

Minnesota railroads
Switching and terminal railroads